Streptomyces osmaniensis is a bacterium species from the genus of Streptomyces which has been isolated from garden soil at the Osmania University in Hyderabad in India.

See also 
 List of Streptomyces species

References

Further reading

External links
Type strain of Streptomyces osmaniensis at BacDive -  the Bacterial Diversity Metadatabase

osmaniensis
Bacteria described in 2010